Urum al-Kubrah Subdistrict  is a subdistrict of Atarib District in western Aleppo Governorate, northwestern Syria. Administrative centre is the town of Urum al-Kubrah.

At the 2004 census, the villages forming this subdistrict had a total population of 22,851.

Cities, towns and villages

References 

Atarib District
Urum al-Kubrah